Yamphudin is a village development committee in the Himalayas of Taplejung District in the Province No. 1 of north-eastern Nepal. At the time of the 1991 Nepal census it had a population of 764 people living in 130 individual households.

References

External links
United Nations map of the municipalities of Taplejung District

Populated places in Taplejung District